WordFarm is a small, independent, literary press based in Seattle, Washington. WordFarm publishes literary fiction, nonfiction and poetry.

History
WordFarm was founded in 2003 by a small group of Chicago-area writers, editors and designers who worked together at InterVarsity Press. The initial vision for the press was to publish a quarterly, literary journal that focused mainly on midwestern writers and poets. The focus shifted to publishing books with the release of John Leax's Grace Is Where I Live in 2004. WordFarm has continued to publish 2-3 titles per year in the genres of poetry, fiction and non-fiction.

Awards

Foreword Magazine Book of the Year Award Winner
2005 Bright Shoots of Everlastingness by Paul J. Willis

Foreword Magazine Book of the Year Award Finalists
2009 The Gravity Soundtrack by Erin Keane
2010 Death-Defying Acts by Erin Keane
2011 Whale Man by Alan Michael Parker
2011 The Assumption by Bryan Dietrich

Authors
Rane Arroyo, Stacy Barton, David Caplan, Steven Cramer, Debra Kang Dean, Bryan D. Dietrich, Forrest Gander, Ruth Goring, Mark Halliday, Jerry Harp, H. L. Hix, Mark Irwin, Erin Keane, Sarah Kennedy, John Leax, Eric Pankey, Alan Michael Parker, Kevin Prufer, Debra Rienstra, Tania Runyan, Lynda Rutledge, Luci Shaw, Lisa Russ Spaar, Michael Theune, Jeanie Thompson, Jonathan Weinert, Paul J. Willis, Matthew Zapruder and James A. Zoller.

References
WordFarm Homepage
WordFarm Profile at Poets & Writers

Book publishing companies of the United States
Publishing companies established in 2003